Royal Air Force Cosford or RAF Cosford (formerly DCAE Cosford)  is a Royal Air Force station in Cosford, Shropshire, just to the northwest of Wolverhampton and next to Albrighton.

History

Origins
RAF Cosford opened in 1938 as a joint aircraft maintenance, storage and technical training unit. It was originally intended to be opened as RAF Donington (the parish in which it is located) but to avoid confusion with the nearby army camp at Donnington it was named after Cosford Grange House which was located at the south western edge of the airfield. It has remained mainly a training unit to this day. The Fulton barrack block was built just before the Second World War as the largest single building barrack block in the UK. The block was named after Captain Fulton (an early Air Force pioneer) and paid for by his widow, Lady Fulton. It is a listed building and is now used for technical training.

No 2 School of Technical Training was formed in 1938 and during the Second World War it trained 70,000 airmen in engine, airframe and armament trades. No 2 School of Technical Training was subsumed into the No 1 School of Technical Training when it moved to Cosford from RAF Halton in Buckinghamshire.

In the Second World War No 12 Ferry Pool of the Air Transport Auxiliary (ATA) was formed at Cosford. This unit delivered Spitfires from the station, returning with bombers or fighters for No 9 Maintenance Unit. Ferry flights were often flown by women pilots. Amy Johnson came to Cosford on more than one occasion.

In 1940 after the Fall of France a depôt was established at RAF Cosford for Free Czechoslovak personnel joining the Royal Air Force Volunteer Reserve.

The airfield runway was originally a grass strip. During the bad winter of 1940–4 landing heavy aircraft, such as Vickers Wellingtons and Avro Ansons, turned the strip into a mudbath.

A substantial hospital staffed by Princess Mary's Royal Air Force Nursing Service personnel was established at RAF Cosford and was the most westerly such RAF hospital in the UK. It consisted of wooden spurred huts. It was the main centre for repatriated prisoners of war, processing more than 13,000 by 1948. Many from the Far East had to remain for long-term treatment. The hospital was open to the general public as well as servicemen and women. It was closed on 31 December 1977 and demolished in 1980.

The extensive sports facilities at Cosford, located around a banked indoor running track, became well known nationally through televised annual indoor championships that featured top athletes from all over the world.

Defence Training Review
Following the UK Government's 2001 Defence Training Review (DTR), the Ministry of Defence proposed handing over armed forces skills training to a private sector bidder for a 25-year term, and it was announced on 17 January 2007 that the Metrix consortium had been awarded Preferred Bidder status for Package 1 of this programme. As a consequence, it was anticipated that all technical training would move from Cosford to Metrix's main campus to be built on the RAF St Athan site over a 5-year period from 2008. This in turn was deferred with no anticipated move from Cosford to St Athan for DCAE and No1 RS staff and trainees before 2014–15 at the earliest. For those other training schools, headquarters and units then at Cosford, decisions were yet to be made about their future location.

On 31 January 2008, the Government announced that when 1 Signal Brigade and 102 Logistics Brigade withdrew from Germany they would move to Cosford.  It was also noted that Metrix proposed to establish a Learning Centre and Design facility at the Cosford site.

In December 2012 the Government announced that training facilities from RAF Cosford would be moved by the end of 2015 to the site of the former RAF Station at Lyneham as part of the projected tri-service Defence College of Technical Training, in common with Army and Royal Navy training facilities that would also be consolidated on the site. However, on 15 September 2015, the Defence Secretary, Michael Fallon announced in Parliament by written statement that: the Lyneham site would be used only by the army; that Cosford would not be closed and would remain as a separate RAF training establishment; that it would be given extra work, with a fourth training school (No 4 School of Technical Training) moving to Cosford from MoD St Athan in south Wales. The announcement was described in local media as "a Government U-turn".

No. 633 Volunteer Gliding Squadron, which operated the Grob Vigilant T1, was disbanded in November 2016.

Based units

Flying and notable non-flying units based at RAF Cosford.

Royal Air Force 
No. 22 Group RAF

 Defence College of Technical Training (DCTT)
 Defence School of Aeronautical Engineering (DSAE)
 Defence School of Aeronautical Engineering Headquarters
No. 1 School of Technical Training (No. 1 SoTT)
 Headquarters No. 1 School of Technical Training
No. 238 Squadron
 Aerosystems Training Squadron
 Mechanical Training Squadron
 Trenchard Squadron
 RAF Aerosystems Engineering and Management Training School (AE&MTS)
Defence School of Communications and Information Systems (DSCIS)
 No. 1 Radio School
 Defence College of Intelligence
Joint Intelligence Training Group (JITG)
Defence School of Photography
 RAF School of Physical Training
Robson Academy of Resilience
No. 6 Flying Training School
University of Birmingham Air Squadron – Grob Tutor T1
No. 8 Air Experience Flight – Grob Tutor T1
Air Training Corps
 Wales and Western Region Headquarters 
 West Mercia West Wing
 West Mercia West Wing Headquarters
 No. 2497 (Cosford) Squadron

No. 38 Group (Air Combat Service Support) RAF

 An element of 85 Expeditionary Logistics Wing, RAF A4 Force
No. 605 (County of Warwick) Squadron (Royal Auxiliary Air Force)

RAF Museum 

RAF Museum Cosford

RAF Voluntary Bands Association
 RAF Cosford Voluntary Band

Civilian 

 RAF Cosford Flying Club –– Piper PA-28
Midlands Air Ambulance – Airbus Helicopters H145

Role and operations

Training 
Cosford became part of the Defence College of Aeronautical Engineering (DCAE), which was formed on 1 April 2004. The Defence College at RAF Cosford came under the Defence Technical Training Change Programme (DCTTP) and as such, with effect from 1 October 2012, was renamed the Defence School of Aeronautical Engineering (DSAE).

Air Ambulance

RAF Cosford's airfield site is home to one of the Midlands Air Ambulance helicopters. The first aircraft arrived on site in October 1991 with two other platforms based elsewhere in the region. Cosford remains the operations hub for the service.

RAF Museum Cosford 

The site is also home to the Aerospace Museum, which is a branch of the Royal Air Force Museum.  Amongst the large collection of military aircraft is a unique collection of research and development aircraft, including one of two existing examples of the TSR2, a multi-role combat aircraft, controversially scrapped by the Wilson Government and still a point of discussion within the RAF.

The Cold War Exhibition was opened on 7 February 2007 by former prime minister Baroness Thatcher and HRH Princess Anne. Exhibits include the only collection of three V bombers (Valiant, Victor and Vulcan) in the same place in the world.

RAF Cosford Air Show

The Cosford Air Show is now the only Royal Air Force air show that is officially supported by the Royal Air Force in the United Kingdom, following the closure of RAF Leuchars and the runway resurfacing at RAF Waddington. The latter events led to the ending of air shows at those stations. The event at RAF Cosford regularly hosts flying and static displays which attract more than 50,000 people.

An air show at Cosford was first proposed in 1978 and has continued to the present day. The event was cancelled in 2003 owing to an inability to secure enough operational military aircraft. The war in Iraq had meant that RAF aircraft were fully committed and none could not be spared for the air show. The runway at Cosford is only  in length.  Consequently, most flying displays necessitate aircraft being flown in either direct from their home stations or after 
a temporary overnight deployment to RAF Shawbury which has a runway  longer.

The airshow varies in detail from year to year but comprises the usual mix of flying and static displays, fun fair rides, concession stands, food outlets and trade stands. It also serves to raise money for charity whilst also being seen by the Royal Air Force as a recruitment event, as part of its wider public engagement. Recent years have seen the promotion of STEM events with guests such as Carol Vorderman highlighting the STEM approach. All profits raised at the event go to supporting charities officially recognized  by the air show committee. The event in 2016 raised £115,000 for RAF charities.

In 2013, Prince Harry, as a member of No. 662 Squadron of the Army Air Corps, took part in the Apache helicopter demonstration at the air show, and, in 2018, Cosford hosted an RAF airshow marking the centenary of the Royal Air Force.

As there is restricted access by motor vehicle, all roads into the Cosford site are one-way during events, with traffic flow inwards in the morning and outwards in the afternoon and evening.  Occasionally, there are tailbacks and queuing on the M54 and the slip and access roads have to be closed on the site reaching its 18,000 vehicle parking limit. The local train operator, Arriva Trains Wales, offers a combined rail and air show ticket at a discount, allowing users direct access to the airshow on foot. Cosford railway station is next to the main crash gate access point at the eastern edge of the airfield.

The are hopes that the airshow might be extended to take place over two days, to rival to the Royal International Air Tattoo which attracts 150,000 spectators.

Heritage

Station badge and motto 
The RAF Cosford Badge is adorned with an oak tree and the motto is Seul Le Premier Pas Coute, which translates as Only the Beginning is Difficult. The oak tree is symbolic of the nearby oak at Boscobel which King Charles II took refuge in after the Battle of Worcester. The idea behind this association is that from little acorns, great oak trees grow (from trainees the airmen of the future grow). This badge was shared with the No. 2 School of Technical Training until 1986, when the School adopted a new badge depicting the iron bridge of Ironbridge and the motto, Scientia Pons Perpetuus Est which translates as Knowledge is a Lasting Bridge.

Built heritage 
The station's Fulton Block, a combined barracks block, institute and mess, was grade II listed in December 2005. Built between 1938 and 1939 as permanent accommodation for 1,000 personnel, it was designed in the Moderne architectural style by J H Binge, of the Air Ministry's Directorate of Works and Buildings.

Station Commanders
The following are the Station Commanders for RAF Cosford, DCAE and DSAE Cosford.

† Died in office May 2011.

Accidents and incidents
On 4 March 2000, Julian Paszki of Wrekin Gliding Club was killed when his Ex-RAF Chipmunk aircraft crashed. The aircraft was seen to veer left and dive into the ground despite being only  in the air at the time. Mr Paszki was pulled alive from the wreckage but died at Selly Oak Hospital later that same day.

In popular culture
RAF Cosford is the location for James May's Toy Stories, where the BBC's Top Gear presenter constructed a 1:1 scale Supermarine Spitfire in the style of an Airfix kit with the help of students from the Thomas Telford school and Air Cadets from the ATC.

See also 

 List of Royal Air Force stations

Notes

References

Bibliography

External links

 
 Cosford Apprentice – RAF Cosford station magazine
 Cosford Flying Club Home Page
 RAF Cosford Air Show
 RAF Cosford Voluntary Band
 RAF Museum Cosford
 UK Military Aeronautical Information Publication – Cosford (EGWC)

Cosford
Military units and formations established in 1938
Cosford
633 VGS